Ek Veer Stree Ki Kahaani... Jhansi Ki Rani ( Story of a brave woman...Queen of Jhansi) is an Indian historical drama based on the life of Lakshmi Bai, the Rani of Jhansi. The series was directed by Jitendra Srivastava and written by Rajesh Saksham, Ila Dutta Bedi, Malavika Asthana, Mairaj Zaidi. It premiered on 18 August 2009 on Zee TV with Ulka Gupta playing young Queen Lakshmi Bai. On 8 June 2010, the story moved on several years and Kratika Sengar portrayed the Queen from there on. The last show episode aired on 19 June 2011 completing 480 episodes.

Plot
14 years old Manikarnika "Manu" lives with her father, Moropant Tambe, a pandit in the Bithoor court of Peshwa Baji Rao II and Nana Saheb. Manu is trained in the arts of war by Tatya Tope. She despises the British rule of India and combats against it. Manu is a thorn in the side of Manson, a British official.

Soon, she gets married to the king of Jhansi, Gangadhar Rao Newalkar. The court of Jhansi is headed by Raghunath Singh and Narsingh Rao. Her name changes to Lakshmi Bai, and her life changes drastically with various plots to separate and kill her and the King. At Jhansi a servant, Moti Bai, collaborates with British officer Captain Fraser but changes sides after realising her mistakes. Meanwhile, the three stepmothers of the King Sukku, Lachchu and Janki also hatches various plots teaming up with the Britishers headed by Lord Dalhousie for capturing the throne of Jhansi but gets failed. Lakshmi Bai takes the form of Kranti Guru to combat the Britishers which everyone in the palace including the king is unaware of except some. Samar Singh initially being a dacoit turns good because of Lakshmi Bai and becomes one of her major support system in combating the Britishers.  King Gangadhar and Queen Lakshmi Bai starts becoming closer understanding each other after various misunderstandings. When the British officer Marshal kills Prachi, Bajirao's little daughter, he is killed by Lakshmi Bai in revenge. When the King discovers that Kranti Guru is Queen Lakshmi Bai, he gets angered while their relationship deteriorates. He agrees with a British officer that Kranti Guru will not be accused of Marshal's death if he hands over Queen's friend, Samar Singh. When Queen saves Samar, the King being furious gives her an ultimatum of  either being a Queen in the palace or a rebellion leaving the palace. Lakshmibai demands him to accept both of her forms, the King not being ready for it, she leaves. She sees the British mistreating the villagers which was before a part of Jhansi. She takes an oath of not leaving the place until the  villages are freed from the Britishers and starts living there with the name Rani without unveiling her real identity, persuades them to fight while she finds Samar Singh there and also comes across Karma who wants to kill the king for which British officer Captain Martin promises Karma the leadership of the villages if he works for them. Karma starts suspecting Lakshmibai.

Years passed but Lakshmi Bai and Gangadhar miss each other. While Gangadhar is in search of her, she hopes that her oath would be fulfilled soon and the King would accept both of her forms. Karma is saved by Lakshmibai after being betrayed by Marshal, who becomes an ally of her. Martin challenges Lakshmi Bai who was disguised as a man named Raja to fight against a mad man to get back the villages under Gangadhar's spectation; She wins admits which her real identity gets revealed in front of everyone. Gangadhar apologizes and accepts Lakshmi Bai, takes her back. Martin retires, and is replaced by Captains Malcom and Ross.

After several failed attempts to kill the King, Captain Nelson kills Ross and frames Samar Singh and hanged while Lakshmibai attempts a lot to prove his innocence. Rani visits Baji Rao, who is severely ill in Bithoor; he dies while Manson tries to conquer Bithoor Fort. Rani fights victoriously, and cuts off Manson's leg. She gives birth to Damodar Rao, and adopts Anand Rao. Nelson kills Damodar, Ali Bahadur kills the King and Captain Hamilton is sent to Jhansi to subdue it. Rani renames Anand Damodar and wages war against the East India Company against the backdrop of the Indian Rebellion of 1857. Hamilton pits Jhansi and the city of Orchha against each other; Orchha's queen, Ladai Sarkar, is sympathetic to the British and holds a grudge against Jhansi. Ladai Sarkar captures Tatya Tope, Raghunath Singh and Gauss Khan but Rani Lakshmi Bai frees them all and wins the battle. The victorious Rani returns to a conquered Jhansi, which she reclaims after threatening the life of the 1st Earl of Dalhouise. Nelson frames her for the death of the king of Mot, and when Ladai Sarkar (the king's sister-in-law) captures Rani he betrays Sarkar. The queens become allies in prison, and after Rani escapes she kills Nelson. Queen Victoria sends General Hugh Henry Rose, who helps Hamilton capture Prince Damodar, as a replacement. After Rani saves her son's life she kills Hamilton; Hugh Rose's army attacks Jhansi Fort, where many of her loyal followers and allies including Guass Khan, Karma, Moropant Tambe, Jhalkaribai, Ladai Sarkar and Kashi die. Bithoor is conquered while Nana Saheb flees to Nepal. 
Before the Final Battle Tatya Tope brings his army for Rani Laxmibai's aid. Rani Laxmibai leaves her fort and goes to Gwalior along with her army . In Gwalior she fights her final battle where she is betrayed by the Prime Minister of Gwallior. In the final battle, Raghunath Singh in an attempt to divert the Britishers is shot dead. During the course of battle, Rani Laxmibai gets severely injured as British general stabs sword in her stomach multiple times. Later she also gets shot in the stomach. She also gets deeply wounded on her head. She hands over Damodar Rao to Tatya Tope and tells him to safeguard the prince before taking on the Britishers for one final time. Moments before her death she tells a villager to burn her body so that the British couldn't touch it.

Cast

Main

 Kratika Sengar as Rani Lakshmibai KrantiGuru / Rana Bakura (2010–2011)
 Ulka Gupta as young Rani Lakshmibai / Manikarnika aka Manu / Kranti Guru (2009–2010)
 Sameer Dharmadhikari as King Gangadhar Rao Newalkar (Rani Laxmibai's Husband)
 Amit Pachori as Tatya Tope / Kranti Guru 2 (Rani Laxmibai's Guru)
 Hemant Choudhary as Raghunath Singh (Commander in Chief of Jhansi)
 Shailesh Dattar as Moropant Tambe (Rani Laxmibai's father)
 Siddharth Vasudev as Samar Singh
 Ravindra Mankani as Baji Rao II
 Dinesh Kaushik as Narsingh Rao
 Puneet Vashist as Karma and Captain Bheem Singh
 Sanjay Swaraj as Rai Dulhajo
 Manoj Verma as Ghulam Ghaus Khan (the most skilled gunman of Jhansi state)
 Shreya Laheri as Sunder
 Aruna Irani as Vahini Sahiba

Recurring

 Ashnoor Kaur as Prachi (Baji Rao's little daughter)
 Puneet Panjwani as Nana Sahib (2010–2011)
 Satyajeet Dubey / Shaheer Sheikh (2009–2010)as young Nana Sahib
 Aarav Chowdhary as Mangal Pandey
 Shagun Ajmani as Moti Bai
 Jaya Bhattacharya as Sakhu Bai
 Amita Nangia as Lachcho Bai
 Sunila Karambelkar as Jankibai
 Priyam Ambalia as Anand Rao / Damodar Rao
 Tanya Malji as young Indu
 Surbhi Tiwari as Maina Bai
 Ishita Vyas as Jhalkaribai / Rana Bankura
 Tarun Khanna as Ali Bahadur
 Sharhaan Singh as Krishna Rao
 Vishnu Sharma as Vadrayan
 Trishikha Tiwari as Vaaishali
 Dev Khubnani as Dhrupad
 Pranitaa Pandit as Juhi
 Soni Singh as Vishkanya
 Minal Kapoor as Mandira
 Eva Grover as Bhagirathi Tambe
 Benaf Dadachandji as Ganga
 Ashwini Kalsekar as Heera Bai
 Achint Kaur as Larai Sarkar of Orchha
 Ulka Gupta as Kaali: The daughter of Bandhu, a tribal. (2011)
Sudhanshu Pandey as Kunwar Yuvraj (Prince of Modh).
 Madhurima Tuli as Gayatri
 Jayajirao Scindia of Gwalior
 Shefali Gupta as Naari Sena Chief
 Raja Bahadur of Gwalior
 Dinkar Rao of Gwalior

Englishmen 

 Alexx O'Nell as Major Robert W. Ellis
 Ben Kaplan as John Lang
 Gary Richardson as The Earl of Dalhousie
 Thomas Munro as Hugh Henry Rose
 David Steele as Captain Mac
 Edward Sonnenblick as Captain James Manson/Captain John W. Nelson
 Ramona Sav as Rose Nelson
 David Steele as Gall
 Maurice Caves as British Officer
 Vikas Verma as Marshall/Captain Robert Hamilton
 Ganpat Roa as Captain Malcolm
 Sam Brown as Captain Raus
 Simon Fraser as Captain Fraser
 Glen David Short as Commissioner Wilson
 Robin Pratt as Sir Moreland (Commissioner of Kanpur)
 Suzanne Bernert as Mistress Moreland
 Muhammad Ayhan Murtaza as General Aron J.smith

Production

Development

In 2007, during the 150th year of Indian Rebellion of 1857, Zee TV started conceptualizing the life of Rani Lakshmi Bai into a series while they roped Mairaj Zaidi as one of the writers who was already exploring on her since ten years.

Originally the track of Ulka Gupta as young Queen Lakshmi Bai was planned for about 150 episodes but was extended till 207 episodes with good response for her.

On 26 January 2011, Zee TV aired a special episode titled Salute at 8 where Queen Lakshmi Bai battles saves her son Anand Rao and her father Moropant Tambe from the Britishers while actors from other series of the channel then were shown paying tribute to Jhansi Rani by singing the National anthem.

Filming
The series is filmed at various historical locations and sets created in Maharashtra, Rajasthan, Madhya Pradesh and Gujarat which includes Karjat, Mumbai in Maharashtra; Maheshwar, Indore in Madhya Pradesh;  Aamgaon, Silvasa in Gujarat; Jaipur, Bhangarh Fort in Rajasthan and few others.

Cancellation and future
The series ended on 19 June 2011 completing 480 episodes. In 2019, the production house Contiole Entertainment rebooted the series as Khoob Ladi Mardaani…Jhansi Ki Rani for Colors TV which aired from 11 February to 12 July 2019 completing 110 episodes.

Dubbed versions 

It was also dubbed in Kannada and was supposed to air on Zee Kannada from 16 May 2011, but due to opposition against airing dubbed serials in Karnataka, the series was dropped. On Indian Independence day in the same year, some portions of the series were used as clips and was shown during the narration on story of Rani Lakshmi Bai in a one-hour special program titled Veeranari Jhansi Rani which lead to the ransacking of Zee Kannada office by the protesters for including some dubbed clips from the series for which Zee Kannada defended, “We aired a one-houred programme based on Jhansi Ki Rani. We used the Hindi footages wherever required and had hired a well-known Kannada presenter to give commentary on it. We have not dubbed the Hindi serial and all the characters in the programme spoke in Hindi and we used Kannada subtitles to convey the message to Kannada audience. Because it was Independence Day, we aired the program on the great historical figure of the first Indian freedom struggle."

Reception

Historical accuracy
The drama was praised for the historical accuracy of the dresses and ornaments worn by the characters. However, doubts were raised on the authenticity of "Ek Veer Stree Ki Kahani... Jhansi Ki Rani" by some historians. Jhansi-based historian Professor Jawaharlal Kanchan protested that the drama is playing with history and providing incorrect information to young minds. The bone of contention for Prof Kanchan is an episode which shows Rani Laxmi Bai wounded by enemy soldiers while on a visit to a hilltop temple in Jhansi. "And despite being hurt she visits the temple. But there is no historical evidence of such an incident and neither is there any such hilltop temple in Jhansi," he points out. Dr A. K. Pandey, director, State Museum, Jhansi states, "makers of the serial should understand that they cannot distort historical facts just for the sake of TRPs."

Reactions from orthodox viewers
Certain reactions from orthodox Indian viewers and historians were negative. The director of the State Museum (Dr A. K. Pandey) at Jhansi states, "Rani Lakshmi Bai is like a goddess to us and seeing her story presented in a distorted manner is painful. Showing intimate bedroom scenes of Jhansi Ki Rani is also unacceptable." Dharmesh Shah, the director of the drama defends it by pointing out, "The British ruled that any kingdom without an heir would be annexed by the East India Company. So Rani Laxmi Bai wanted an heir, because of which we were required to show those intimate scenes. There is no need of creating a hullabaloo."

Critics
Drawing reference to Vrindhavan Lal Verma's novel Jhansi Ki Rani, Dainik Bhaskar stated that the relationship between King Gangadhar Rao and Mothi Bai in the series was not portrayed correctly.

Deccan Herald stated, "Be it swordsmanship, horse-riding or just mastering the dialect, the beauty is leaving no stone unturned in ensuring that she plays the legendary freedom fighter with dignity and elan.

Ratings
Since its inception, the series was well received and was often seen in weekly list of top 10 watched Hindi GECs in its run time. The series opened with a rating of 4.09 TVR in its debut week (week 34 of 2009) becoming seventh most watched Hindi GEC. In week 8 of 2010, it was at tenth position with 3.9 TVR. In weeks sixteen to eighteen of 2010, it maintained its position in one of the top Hindi GEC programs with 4.2 TVR. In week ending 26 June 2010 and the previous week, it garnered 3.5 and 3.4 TVR. As in October 2010, it was at eighth position in top ten Hindi GECs ranging between 2.7 and 3.2 TVR. In week 4 of 2011, it garnered 4.46 TVR occupying fourth position. In week 9, it dropped to tenth position with 3.58 TVR.

Awards
2010 Zee Gold Awards
 Best Videography (Fiction) - Deepak Pandey
 Best Art Direction - Sandesh Gondhalekar
 Best Editing
 Performer of the Year - Ulka Gupta
2010 FICCI Award
 Best Entertainer of the Year
 Ulka Gupta
 Best Dialogue Writer Awards For Historical Drama

See also
 The Revolt of 1857
 1857 Kranti (TV series)

References

External links
 

2009 Indian television series debuts
2011 Indian television series endings
Historical television series
Indian historical television series
Indian period television series
Zee TV original programming
Cultural depictions of Rani Laxmibai
Indian independence movement fiction
Television series set in the 19th century